Professori Uuno D.G. Turhapuro is a Finnish 1975 comedy film written by Spede Pasanen and directed by Ere Kokkonen. It is the second film in the Uuno Turhapuro series.

Plot
Uuno is unemployed and his friends try to arrange a job for him. With his imagination, though, and the help of Härski Hartikainen (Spede Pasanen), he somehow manages to avoid all work, until he becomes what he has always dreamt of being - a film star. Uuno's father-in-law has other plans for his occupation, though: since Uuno knows the Dandelion, he has potential for a professor of botany.

References

External links

1975 films
1975 comedy films
1970s Finnish-language films
Spede Pasanen
Finnish comedy films
Finnish black-and-white films
Finnish sequel films